Tillandsia camargoensis is a species in the genus Tillandsia. This species is endemic to Bolivia.

References

camargoensis
Flora of Bolivia